Anita Community School District was a school district headquartered in Anita, Iowa. The district occupied portions of Cass, Adair, and Audubon counties, and served Anita and Wiota.

Circa 2002 it began a "grade sharing" arrangement with the C & M Community School District, in which the districts sent each other's students to their schools. The Anita district operated the high school while the C&M district operated the middle school; both districts had their own elementary schools. The Anita district had about 272 students in the 2008–2009 school year.

On July 1, 2011, the Anita district merged with the C & M district to form the CAM Community School District.

References

External links

Defunct school districts in Iowa
School districts disestablished in 2011
2011 disestablishments in Iowa
Education in Adair County, Iowa
Education in Audubon County, Iowa
Education in Cass County, Iowa